A real estate agent, referred to often as a Realtor and/or a real estate broker is a person who represents sellers or buyers of real estate or real property. While a broker may work independently, an agent usually works under a licensed broker to represent clients. Brokers and agents are licensed by the state to negotiate sales agreements and manage the documentation required for closing real estate transactions. Buyers and sellers are generally advised to consult a licensed real estate professional for a written definition of an individual state's laws of agency. Many states require written disclosures to be signed by all parties outlining the duties and obligations.

Generally, real estate brokers or agents fall into four categories of representation:

Seller's agents, commonly called "listing brokers" or "listing agents", are contracted by owners to assist with marketing property for sale or lease.
Buyer's agents are brokers or salespersons who assist buyers by helping them purchase property.
Dual agents help both the buyer and the seller in the same transaction. To protect their license to practice, a real estate broker owes both parties fair and honest dealing and must request that both parties (seller and buyer) sign a dual agency agreement. Special laws/rules often apply to dual agents, especially in negotiating price. In dual agency situations, a conflict of interest is more likely to occur, typically resulting in the loss of advocacy for both parties. Individual state laws vary and interpret dual agency rather differently, with some no longer allowing it. In some states, dual agency can be practiced in situations where the same brokerage (but not agent) represents both the buyer and the seller. If one agent from the brokerage has a home listed and another agent from that brokerage has a buyer-brokerage agreement with a buyer who wishes to buy the listed property, dual agency occurs by allowing each agent to be designated as an "intra-company" agent. Only the broker is the dual agent.
Transaction brokers provide the buyer and seller with a limited form of representation but without any fiduciary obligations. Having no more than a facilitator relationship, transaction brokers assist buyers, sellers, or both during the transaction without representing the interests of either party who may then be regarded as customers. The assistance provided are the legal documents for an agreement between the buyer and seller on how a particular transfer of property will happen.

A real estate broker typically receives a real estate commission for successfully completing a sale. Across the U.S, this commission can generally range between 5-6% of the property's sale price for a full service broker but this percentage varies by state and even region. This commission can be divided up with other participating real estate brokers or agents. Flat-fee brokers and fee-for-service brokers can charge significantly less depending on the type of services offered.

Real estate licensing and education
To become licensed in the United States, real estate brokers and salespersons are authorized by each state, not by the federal government. Each state has a real estate commission (governing body) who monitors and licenses real estate brokers and agents.  For example, some states only allow lawyers to create documentation to transfer real property, while other states also allow the licensed real estate agent to do so. Most states require that an applicant must attend a pre-license course with a minimum number of classroom hours to study real estate law before taking the state licensing exam. Such education is often provided by real-estate firms or by education companies, either of which is typically licensed to teach such courses within their respective states. The courses are designed to prepare the new licensee primarily for the legal aspects of the practice of transferring real estate and to pass the state licensing exam. Some states, like Massachusetts, require as little as 40-hours classroom time to get licensed. Others, like California, mandate over 100 hours. Many states allow candidates to take the pre-licensing class virtually. Candidates must subsequently pass the state exam for a real estate agent's license.

Upon passing, the new licensee must place their license with an established real-estate firm and must work under a broker's license. Typically, there may be multiple licensees holding broker's licenses within a firm, but only one broker, the principal one, manages the firm itself. That individual is then legally responsible for all licensees held under their license.

In most jurisdictions in the United States, a person must have a license to perform licensed activities, and these activities are defined within the statutes of each state. The main feature of the requirement for having a license to perform those activities is the work done "for compensation". Hence, hypothetically, if a person wants to help a friend out in either selling or buying a property, and no compensation of any kind is expected in return, then a license is not needed to perform all the work. However, since most people would expect to be compensated for their efforts and skills, a license would be required by law before a person may receive remuneration for services rendered as a real estate broker or agent. Unlicensed activity is illegal and the state real estate commission has the authority to fine people who are acting as real estate licensees, but buyers and sellers acting as principals in the sale or purchase of real estate are usually not required to be licensed. It is important to note that in some states, lawyers handle real estate sales for compensation without being licensed as brokers or agents. However, even lawyers can only perform real estate activities that are incidental to their original work as a lawyer. It cannot be the case that a lawyer can become a seller's selling agent if that is all the service that is being requested by the client. Lawyers would still need to be licensed as a broker if they wish to perform licensed activities. Nevertheless, lawyers do get a break in the minimum education requirements (for example, 90 hours in Illinois).

Requirements vary among states but after some period of time working as an agent, one may return to the classroom and sit for a test to become a broker. For example, California and Florida require licensees to have a minimum experience of two years as a full-time licensed agent within the prior 5 years. However, Indiana only requires one year experience as a real estate salesperson and Arizona requires three out of the prior five years. Brokers may manage or own firms. Each branch office of a larger real estate firm must be managed by a broker.

Some other states have recently eliminated the salesperson's license, instead, all licensees in those states automatically earn their broker's license.

The term "agent" is not to be confused with salesperson or broker. An agent is simply a licensee that has entered into an agency relationship with a client. A broker can also be an agent for a client. It is commonly the firm that has the actual legal relationship with the client through one of their sales staff, be they salespersons or brokers.

In all states, the real estate licensee must disclose to prospective buyers and sellers the nature of their relationship   within the transaction and with the parties. See below for a broker/licensee relationship to sellers and their relationship with buyers.

In the United States, there are commonly two levels of real estate professionals licensed by the individual states but not by the federal government:

Specific representation laws
Some U.S. state real estate commissions – notably Florida's after 1992 (and extended in 2003) and Colorado's after 1994 (with changes in 2003) created the option of having no agency or fiduciary relationship between brokers and sellers or buyers.

As noted by the South Broward Board of Realtors, Inc. in a letter to State of Florida legislative committees:

The result was that, in 2003, Florida created a system where the default brokerage relationship had "all licensees ... operating as transaction brokers, unless a single agent or no brokerage relationship is established, in writing, with the customer" and the statute required written disclosure of the transaction brokerage relationship to the buyer or seller customer only through July 1, 2008.

In the case of both Florida and Colorado, dual agency and sub-agency (where both listing and selling agents represent the seller) no longer exist.

Other brokers and agents may focus on representing buyers or tenants in a real estate transaction. However, licensing as a broker or salesperson authorizes the licensee to legally represent parties on either side of a transaction and providing the necessary documentation for the legal transfer of real property. This business decision is for the licensee to decide. They are fines for people acting as real estate agents when not licensed by the state.

In the United Kingdom, an estate agent is a person or business entity whose business is to market real estate on behalf of clients. There are significant differences between the actions, powers, obligations, and liabilities of brokers and estate agents in each country, as different countries take markedly different approaches to the marketing and selling of real property.

Written agreement
It is important to have a clear written legal documentation for an agreement between the broker and the client to guarantee their the protection of both.  If the parties only have an oral agreement, it is more likely for a dispute to arise concerning the agreement to represent clients and for how real property being sold.  Legal documentation is required to define whether the broker can enforce the parties' compensation agreement, the duration of the relationship, whether the relationship is "exclusive", and other issues.  Enforceability of oral agreements, what kinds of legal agreements are required to be in writing, and other important issues vary from state to state.

The difference between salespersons and brokers 
Before the Multiple Listing Service (MLS) was introduced in 1967, when brokers (and their licensees) only represented sellers by providing a service to provide legal documentation on the transfer real property, the term "real estate salesperson" may have been more appropriate than it is today, given the various ways that brokers and licensees now help buyers through the legal process of transferring real property. Legally, however, the term "salesperson" is still used in many states to describe a real estate licensee.

Real estate salesperson (or, in some states, real estate broker)
When a person first becomes licensed to become a real estate agent, they obtain a real estate salesperson's license (some states use the term "broker") from the state in which they will practice. To obtain a real estate license, the candidate must take specific coursework (between 40 and 120 hours) and pass a state exam on real estate law and practice. To work, salespersons must be associated with (and act under the authority of) a real estate broker. In Delaware, for example, the licensing course requires the candidate to take 99 classroom hours in order to qualify to sit for the state and national examination. In Ohio, a license candidate must complete 120 hours of classroom education.  Each successive year thereafter, the license holder must participate in continuing education in order to remain abreast of state and national changes.

Many states also have reciprocal agreements with other states, allowing a licensed individual from a qualified state to take the second state's exam without completing the course requirements or, in some cases, take only a state law exam.

Real estate broker (or, in some states, qualifying broker)
After gaining some years of experience in real estate sales, a salesperson may decide to become licensed as a real estate broker (or Principal/qualifying broker) in order to own, manage, or operate their own brokerage. In addition, some states allow college graduates to apply for a broker's license without years of experience. College graduates fall into this category once they have completed the state-required courses as well. California allows licensed attorneys to become brokers upon passing the broker exam without having to take the requisite courses required of an agent. Commonly more coursework and a broker's state exam on real estate law must be passed. Upon obtaining a broker's license, a real estate agent may continue to work for another broker in a similar capacity as before (often referred to as a broker associate or associate broker) or take charge of their own brokerage and hire other salespersons (or broker), licensees. Becoming a branch office manager may or may not require a broker's license. Some states allow licensed attorneys to become real estate brokers without taking any exam. In some states, there are no "salespeople" as all licensees are brokers.

Agency relationships with clients versus non-agency relationships with customers
Agency relationships in residential real estate transactions involve the legal representation by a real estate broker (on behalf of a real estate company) of the principal, whether that person(s) is a buyer or a seller. The broker and his licensed real estate salespersons (salesmen or brokers) then become the agents of the principal.

 Agency relationship: Conventionally, the broker provides a conventional full-service, commission-based brokerage relationship under a signed listing agreement with a seller or a "buyer representation" agreement with a buyer, thus creating under common law in most states an agency relationship with fiduciary obligations. The seller or buyer is then a client of the broker. Some states also have statutes that define and control the nature of the representation.

 Non-agency relationship: where no written agreement or fiduciary relationship exists, a real estate broker and his sales staff work with a principal who is known as the broker's customer. When a buyer who has not entered into a Buyer Agency agreement with the broker buys a property, that broker functions as the sub-agent of the seller's broker. When a seller chooses to work with a transaction broker, there is no agency relationship created.

There are state laws defining the types of relationships that can exist between clients and real estate licensees, and the lawful duties of real estate licensees to represent clients and members of the public. Rules on the types of relationships between clients and real estate licensees vary substantially as defined by the law from state to state.

Designated agency
The most recent development in the practice of real estate is "designated agency" which was created to permit individual licensees within the same firm, designated by the principal broker, to act as agents for individual buyers and sellers within the same transaction. In theory, therefore, two agents within the same firm act in strict fiduciary roles for their respective clients. Some states have adopted this practice into their state laws and others have decided this function is inherently problematic, just as was a dual agency. The practice was invented and promoted by larger firms to make it possible in theory to handle the entire transaction in the house without creating a conflict of interest within the firm

Types of services that a broker can provide
Real Estate Services are also called trading services  by some jurisdictions.
Since each province's and state's laws may differ, it is generally advised that prospective sellers or buyers consult a licensed real estate professional.

Some examples:

 Comparative Market Analysis (CMA) — an estimate of a property's value compared with others. This differs from an appraisal in that property currently for sale may be taken into consideration (competition for the subject property).
 Total Market Overview — an objective method for determining a property's value, where a CMA is subjective.
 Broker's price opinion — estimate of a property's value or potential selling price.
 Real estate appraisal — in most states, only if the broker is also licensed as an appraiser.
 Exposure — marketing the real property to prospective buyers.
 Facilitating a Purchase — guiding a buyer through the process.
 Facilitating a Sale — guiding a seller through the selling process.
 For sale by owner (FSBO) document preparation — preparing the necessary paperwork for "For Sale By Owner" sellers.
 Home Selling Kits — guides advising how to market and sell a property.
 Hourly Consulting for a fee, based on the client's needs.
 Leasing for a fee or percentage of the gross lease value.
 Property management.
 Exchanging property.
 Auctioning property (in most states, only if the broker is also licensed as an auctioneer).
 Preparing contracts and leases (not in all states).

These services are also changing as a variety of real estate trends transform the industry.

Real estate brokers and sellers

Services provided to seller as client
Upon signing a listing contract with the seller wishing to sell the real estate, the brokerage attempts to earn a commission by finding a buyer and writing an offer, a legal document, for the sellers' property for the highest possible price on the best terms for the seller. In Canada and the United States, most laws require the real estate agent to forward all written offers to the seller for consideration or review.

To help accomplish the goal of finding buyers, a real estate agency commonly does the following:
 Lists the property for sale to the public, often on an MLS, in addition to any other methods.
 Provides the seller with a real property condition disclosure (if required by law) and other necessary forms.
 Keeps the client abreast of the rapid changes in the real estate industry, swings in market conditions, and the availability and demand for property inventory in the area.
 Prepares paperwork describing the property for advertising, pamphlets, open houses, etc.
 Places a "For Sale" sign on the property indicating how to contact the real estate office and agent.
 Advertises the property, which may include social media and digital marketing in addition to paper advertising.  
 Holds an open house to show the property.
 Serves as a contact available to answer any questions about the property and schedule showing appointments.
 Ensures that buyers are pre-screened and financially qualified to buy the property. (Sellers should be aware that the underwriter for any real estate mortgage loan is the final say.)
 Negotiates price on behalf of the sellers. 
 Prepares legal documentation or a “purchase and sale agreement” on how the transaction will proceed.
 Acts as a fiduciary for the seller, which may include preparing a standard real estate purchase contract.
 Holds an earnest payment cheque in escrow from the buyer(s) until the closing if necessary. In many states, the closing is the meeting between the buyer and seller where the property is transferred and the title is conveyed by a deed. In other states, especially those in the West, closings take place during a defined escrow period when buyers and sellers each sign the appropriate papers transferring title, but do not meet each other.
 Negotiates on their client's behalf when a property inspection is complete. Often having to get estimates for repairs.
Guards the client's legal interests (along with the attorney) when facing tough negotiations or confusing contracts.

Flat-Fee Real Estate Agents 
Flat-fee real estate agents charge a seller of a property a flat fee, $500 for example, as opposed to a traditional or full-service real estate agent who charges a percentage of the sale price. In exchange, the seller’s property will appear in the Multi Listing Service (MLS), but the seller will represent him or herself when showing the property and negotiating a sales price. The result is the seller pays less commission overall (roughly half) when the property sells. This is because a seller will pay a percentage of the sales price to a buyer’s agent but not have to pay a percentage to a seller’s agent (because there isn’t one – the seller is representing himself).

The listing contract

Several types of listing contracts exist between broker and seller. These may be defined as:
 Exclusive right to sell
The broker is given the exclusive right to market the property and represents the seller exclusively. This is referred to as seller agency. However, the brokerage also offers to cooperate with other brokers and agrees to allow them to show the property to prospective buyers and offers a share of the total real estate commission.
 Exclusive agency
Exclusive agency allows only the broker the right to sell the property, and no offer of compensation is ever made to another broker. In this case, the property will never be entered into an MLS. Naturally, this limits the exposure of the property to only one agency.
 Open listing
The property is available for sale by any real estate professional who can advertise, show, or negotiate the sale. The broker/agent who first brings an acceptable offer would receive compensation. Real estate companies will typically require that a written agreement for an open listing be signed by the seller to ensure payment of a commission if a sale takes place.

Although there can be other ways of doing business, a real estate brokerage usually earns its commission after the real estate broker and a seller enter into a listing contract and fulfill agreed-upon terms specified within that contract. The seller's real estate is then listed for sale.

In most of North America, a listing agreement or contract between broker and seller must include the following: 
 starting and ending dates of the agreement; 
 the price at which the property will be offered for sale; 
 the amount of compensation due to the broker;
 how much, if any, of the compensation, will be offered to a cooperating broker who may bring a buyer (required for MLS listings).

Net listings: Property listings at an agreed-upon net price that the seller wishes to receive with any excess going to the broker as commission. In many states including Georgia, New Jersey and Virginia [18 VAC §135-20-280(5)] net listings are illegal, other states such as California and Texas state authorities discourage the practice and have laws to try and avoid manipulation and unfair transactions [22 TAC §535(b)] and (c).

Brokerage commissions
In consideration of the brokerage successfully finding a buyer for the property, a broker anticipates receiving a commission for the services the brokerage has provided. Usually, the payment of a commission to the brokerage is contingent upon finding a buyer for the real estate, the successful negotiation of a purchase contract between the buyer and seller, or the settlement of the transaction and the exchange of money between buyer and seller. Under common law, a real estate broker is eligible to receive their commission, regardless of whether the sale actually takes place, once they secure a buyer who is ready, willing, and able to purchase the dwelling. The median real estate commission charged to the seller by the listing (seller's) agent is 6% of the purchase price. Typically, this commission is split evenly between the seller's and buyer's agents, with the buyer's agent generally receiving a commission of 3% of the purchase price of the home sold.

In North America, commissions on real estate transactions are negotiable and new services in real estate trends have created ways to negotiate rates. Local real estate sales activity usually dictates the amount of agreed commission. Real estate commission is typically paid by the seller at the closing of the transaction as detailed in the listing agreement.

Economist Steven D. Levitt famously argued in his 2005 book Freakonomics that real estate brokers have an inherent conflict of interest with the sellers they represent because their commission gives them more motivation to sell quickly than to sell at a higher price. Levitt supported his argument with a study finding brokers tend to put their own houses on the market for longer and receive higher prices for them compared to when working for their clients. He concluded that broker commissions will reduce in future. A 2008 study by other economists found that when comparing brokerage without listing services, brokerage significantly reduced the average sale price.

RESPA
Real estate brokers who work with lenders can not receive any compensation from the lender for referring a residential client to a specific lender. To do so would be a violation of a United States federal law known as the Real Estate Settlement Procedures Act (RESPA). RESPA ensures that buyers and sellers are given adequate notice of the Real Estate settlement process. Commercial transactions are exempt from RESPA. All lender compensation to a broker must be disclosed to all parties. A commission may also be paid during negotiation of contract base on seller and agent.

Lock box 

With the seller's permission, a lock box is placed on homes that are occupied, and after arranging an appointment with the homeowner, agents can show the home to prospective buyers. When a property is vacant, a lock-box will generally be placed on the front door. The listing broker helps arrange showings of the property by various real estate agents from all companies associated with the MLS. The lock-box contains the key to the door of the property, and the box can only be opened by licensed real estate agents.

Shared commissions with co-op brokers
If any buyer's broker or his agents brings the buyer for the property, the buyer's broker would typically be compensated with a co-op commission coming from the total offered to the listing broker, often about half of the full commission from the seller. If an agent or salesperson working for the buyer's broker brings the buyer for the property, then the buyer's broker would commonly compensate his agent with a fraction of the co-op commission, again as determined in a separate agreement. A discount brokerage may offer a reduced commission if no other brokerage firm is involved and no co-op commission paid out.

If there is no co-commission to pay to another brokerage, the listing brokerage receives the full amount of the commission minus any other types of expenses.

Real estate brokers and buyers

Services provided to buyers

Buyers as clients 
With the increase in the practice of buyer brokerages in the United States, agents (acting under their brokers) have been able to represent buyers in the transaction with a written "Buyer Agency Agreement" not unlike the "Listing Agreement" for sellers referred to above. In this case, buyers are clients of the brokerage.

Some brokerages represent buyers only and are known as exclusive buyer agents (EBAs). Consumer Reports states, "You can find a true buyer's agent only at a firm that does not accept listings." The advantages of using an Exclusive Buyer Agent is that they avoid conflicts of interest by working in the best interests of the buyer and not the seller, avoid homes and neighborhoods likely to fare poorly in the marketplace, ensure the buyer does not unknowingly overpay for a property, fully inform the buyer of adverse conditions, encourage the buyer to make offers based on true value instead of list price, and work to save the buyer money. A buyer agency firm commissioned a study that found EBA purchased homes were 17 times less likely to go into foreclosure.

A real estate brokerage attempts to do the following for the buyers of real estate only when they represent the buyers with some form of written buyer-brokerage agreement:
 Find real estate in accordance with the buyers needs, specifications, and cost.
 Take buyers to and shows them properties available for sale.
 Pre-screen buyers to ensure they are financially qualified to buy the properties shown (or use a mortgage professional, such a bank's mortgage specialist or alternatively a mortgage broker, to do that task).
 Negotiate price and terms on behalf of the buyers.
 Prepare standard real estate purchase contract. 
 Act as a fiduciary for the buyer.
 Assist the buyer in making an offer for the property.

Buyers as customers 
In most states until the 1990s, buyers who worked with an agent of a real estate broker in finding a house were customers of the brokerage since the broker represented only sellers.

Today, state laws differ. Buyers or sellers may be represented. Typically, a written "Buyer Brokerage" agreement is required for the buyer to have representation (regardless of which party is paying the commission), although by his/her actions, an agent can create representation.

Continuing education 
States issue licenses for an annual or  multi- year period and require real estate agents and brokers to complete continuing education prior to renewing their licenses. For example, California licensees must complete 45 hours of continuing education every 4 years in topics such as agency, trust fund handling, consumer protection, fair housing, ethics, and risk management. Many states recognize licenses from other states (reciprocal licenses) and issue licenses to existing agents and firms upon request without additional education or testing; however, the license must be granted before real estate service is provided in the state.

California does not have license reciprocity with other states. An applicant for licensure is not, however, required to be a resident of California to obtain a license.

In Illinois, the salesperson license was replaced by a broker license in 2011. the new license requires 90 hours of pre-license education, 15 of which must be interactive, and 30 hours of post-license education. The pre-license education requirement includes a 75-hour topics course and a 15-hour applied real estate principles course.

Organizations

Several notable groups exist to promote the real estate industry and to assist members who are in it.

The National Association of Realtors (NAR) is the largest real estate organization and one of the largest trade groups anywhere. Their membership exceeds one million. NAR also has state chapters as well as thousands of local chapters. Upon joining a local chapter, a new member is automatically enrolled in the state and national organizations. When the principals of a firm join, all licensed agents in that firm must also belong. A Realtor is a real estate broker or salesperson who is also a member of the National Association of Realtors, which is an industry trade association. The word "Realtor" is a registered trademark, protected under the US and international law.

The Realtor Political Action Committee (RPAC) is a separate entity and the lobbying arm of NAR. In 2005, they were considered the largest PAC in the United States. According to realtor.org, RPAC is the largest direct contributor to federal candidates.

The National Association of Real Estate Brokers (NAREB) was founded in 1947 as an alternative for African Americans who were excluded from the dominant NAR. Both groups allow members to join without regard to race. However, NAREB has historically been an African American-centric group with a focus on developing housing resources for intercity populations.

The Real Estate Institute of Canada (REIC) was established in 1955 and is a not-for-profit membership organization offering continuing education courses and designation programs for Canadian real estate professionals across multiple sectors.

See also

 Buyer brokerage
 Closing (real estate)
 Estate agent
 Estate (land)
 Exclusive buyer agent
 Flat-fee MLS
 For sale by owner
 Home inspection
 Independent contractor
 Index of real estate articles
 Investment rating for real estate
 Mortgage broker
 Property manager
 Real estate
 Real estate appraisal
 Real estate contract
 Real estate development
 Real estate investing
 Real estate settlement company
 Real estate trends
 Real property
 Strata management

References

External links 
 

 Real estate brokers
Sales occupations